This is a timeline of the History of Kenya comprising important legal and territorial changes as well as political, social, and economic events in Kenya, read more at History of Kenya.

Pleistocene

3rd millennium BC

2nd millennium BC

1st millennium BC

1st century BC

1st century AD

4th century AD

7th century AD

11th century

12th century

14th century

15th century

16th century

17th century

18th century

19th century

20th century

21st century

See also
 Timelines of cities in Kenya: Mombasa, Nairobi

References

Bibliography

External links
 

Kenya history-related lists
History of Kenya
kenya
Years in Kenya